Iwan is a masculine given name and a surname.

It is a Welsh and Cornish name related to Ifan and derived from the Latin Johannes, which means, "God is gracious." 
A Welsh form of "John" is Ieuan.

It is also found in Germanic and Slavic languages as a variant of Ivan (name), which has a common origin. Another Welsh given name related to this is Ioan.

People (given name)
 Iwan (musician) (born 1985), Ghanaian reggae and dance hall performer
 Iwan (singer) (born 1980), Lebanese singer
 Iwan Baan, Dutch architectural photographer
 Iwan Babij, Ukrainian educator and activist
 Iwan Bloch, Berlin dermatologist, sexologist and Marquis de Sade scientist
 Iwan Edwards, Canadian choral conductor
 Iwan Fals, Indonesian singer, commercial star, and songwriter
 Iwan Gilkin, Belgian poet
 Iwan Griffiths, Welsh drummer
 Iwan Gronow, British bass guitarist
 Iwan Iwanoff, Bulgarian architect
 Gwilliam Iwan Jones, Welsh photographer and anthropologist
 Iwan Knorr, German teacher of music
 Iwan Müller, Estonian-born German clarinetist
 Iwan Pylypow, the first Ukrainian immigrant to Canada
 Iwan Redan, Dutch footballer
 Iwan Rheon, Welsh actor
 Iwan "Iwcs" Roberts, Welsh actor, lyricist and singer
 Iwan Roberts, Welsh footballer
 Iwan Serrurier, Dutch-born electrical engineer, inventor of Moviola
 Iwan Thomas, Welsh athlete
 Iwan Tirta, Indonesian batik fashion designer
 Iwan Tukalo, Scottish rugby union footballer
 Iwan Tyszkiewicz, Socinian Unitarian executed for blasphemy and heresy by the Polish-Lithuanian Commonwealth
 Iwan Wirth, Swiss contemporary art dealer and gallery owner

People (surname)
 Andrzej Iwan (1959–2022), retired Polish football player
 Bartosz Iwan (born 1984), Polish footballer, son of Andrzej Iwan
 Bret Iwan (born 1982), American illustrator and voice artist
 Dafydd Iwan (born 1943), Welsh folk singer and politician
 Emrys ap Iwan (1848–1906), Welsh literary critic and writer on politics and religion
 Llion Iwan, Welsh journalist, documentary producer, and author
 Tomasz Iwan (born 1971), retired Polish football player
 Wilhelm Iwan (1871–1958), German author, historian, and theologian

References

Slavic masculine given names
Welsh masculine given names
Surnames of Welsh origin